Rene Tiefert (born 28 June 1984) is a German bobsledder who has competed since 2001. His best World Cup finish was second in the four-man event at Whistler and Lake Placid in November–December 2010.

References

1984 births
Living people
German male bobsledders